Alfonso Rueda Valenzuela (born 8 July 1968) is a Spanish People's Party (PP) politician. Elected to the Parliament of Galicia in 2009, he succeeded Alberto Núñez Feijóo as president of the People's Party of Galicia (PPdeG) and President of Galicia in 2022.

Biography
Born in Pontevedra, Rueda is the son of Antonio Rueda Crespo, a People's Alliance councillor in the city. He graduated in law from the University of Santiago de Compostela, and joined the New Generations of the People's Party in 1993.

From 2000 to 2005, Rueda was Director General of Local Administration in the government of Manuel Fraga, and also served as minister of Public Administration and of Justice. He was appointed secretary general of the People's Party of Galicia (PPdeG) by its president Alberto Núñez Feijóo in 2006. In 2009, having been elected to the Parliament of Galicia by the Pontevedra constituency, he became an advisor to President of Galicia Feijóo, becoming vice president three years later. He took 97.14% of the votes in March 2016 to succeed Rafael Louzán as president of the PPdeG in the Province of Pontevedra.

In 2022, Feijóo announced his departure to be the PP's national leader. Rueda was the sole candidate to replace him as leader of the PPdeG in April, and he was elected by the Parliament to replace him as regional president in May. He formed a government, with the only difference from its predecessor being Diego Calvo as second vice president.

Personal life
Rueda is the father of two daughters. He takes part in long-distance running and cycling, and is a fan of RC Celta de Vigo.

References

1968 births
Living people
People from Pontevedra
People's Party (Spain) politicians
Members of the 8th Parliament of Galicia
Members of the 9th Parliament of Galicia
Members of the 10th Parliament of Galicia
Government ministers of Galicia (Spain)
Presidents of the Regional Government of Galicia